éS may refer to:
Élet és Irodalom - (also known as ÉS; meaning Life and Literature in English) a weekly Hungarian magazine about literature and politics.
éS - skateboarding footwear and apparel brand founded in 1995.